Fairfax Village is a small neighborhood of garden apartments and townhouses located in southeast Washington, D.C. in the Hillcrest area. It is bound by Alabama Avenue SE to the northwest, Pennsylvania Avenue SE to the northeast, Suitland Road to the southwest, and Southern Avenue to the east.

References 

Neighborhoods in Southeast (Washington, D.C.)